Operation Tar Heels was a military operation launched by US Marines in Laghman Province, eastern Afghanistan. Patrols of around 30 men were ambushed in several places, but the Taliban attackers were driven back. The Marines lost team leader Nicholas Kirven in the meantime. Otherwise, the operation to patrol Laghman Province was a success.

Background 
Hours before the Marines were ambushed, they had set out on a rainy morning in a convoy in Laghman Province. It was May 8, 2005, the third day of a week-long patrol called Operation Tar Heels. The platoon of 30 men, commanded by Marine Lieutenant Samuel Monte, had driven as far as it could before the road ended, compelling the Marines to dismount and walk along a valley trail that led to several remote villages. The men had left their bulky flak vests at their patrol base and wore only their SAPI (Small Arms Protective Insert), two-inch-thick bulletproof plates that fit in a vest-so they would have a lighter load when hiking in the mountains. Without full body armor, they could move faster in case of coming into contact with the Taliban, who did not wear any body armor. The goal of the operation was to meet with tribal leaders to find out what help they needed, like medical kits or veterinary visits. The Marines were also hoping to obtain information about the drug lords and militants who were freely operating and living in the area.

Battle of Shatagal 
At the third village visited by the Marines, they learned that they were being targeted for an ambush (an interpreter found out over the radio that the Taliban had located "thirty Americans. They will not get out alive"). In a Marine drill called a "movement contact", the Americans went looking for the militants. Shortly afterward, the Marines, via an interpreter, discovered that they would be ambushed on their way out of the village. Monte had his men stop and form defensive positions in the valley, bordered by two ridges and a river. The Marines then spotted 12 insurgents crossing the river. After being shot at, they (the insurgents), scattered into a large draw (a natural depression into which water drains), before hiding in caves and rock outcroppings. Despite being pummeled by two A10 Warthogs, the insurgents fired from a cave and mortally wounded team leader Nicholas Kirven and Corporal Richard Schoener. Team leader Jason Valencia then cleared out the cave in which Kirven and Schoener's killer was hiding. Another message was decoded by the interpreter, which said that 30 more ambushers were coming. With the use of AC130 gunships, fourteen more charging militants were wiped out. By now, it was nighttime on May 8 and another 15 insurgents were killed. Although what was supposed to be a six-hour patrol turned into a 22-hour firefight, the ambushers were neutralized.

Aftermath 
On February 1, 2006, the hard-fighting Lieutenant Stephen Boada was awarded the Silver Star for his bravery in battle. He also received a Purple Heart for being wounded in the battle. So did Nicholas "Nick" Kirven and Richard "Rick" Schoener, who died after the battle in the same hospital that treated Boada.

References 

Laghman Province
Military operations of the War in Afghanistan (2001–2021)
2000s in Afghanistan
2005 in Afghanistan